is a 2015 magical boy anime television series created by Kurari Umatani and produced by Diomedéa. The series is directed by Shinji Takamatsu and written by Michiko Yokote. The series premiered on January 6, 2015. The anime is licensed by Madman Entertainment in Australia and New Zealand and by Ponycan USA in North America. Funimation and Crunchyroll are currently streaming the anime. A second season of the anime began airing on July 7, 2016.

The story focuses on the lives of five ordinary boys, each of them possessing an extraordinary nature-based power given to them by a mysterious creature from outer space. The group, calling themselves the "Earth Defense Club", must stop the enemies intent on conquering Earth known as the "Earth Conquest Club".

A spin-off manga titled Binan Kokou Chikyuu Seifuku-bu Love! started serialization in Pony Canyon's web comics magazine online, on October 16, 2014. A light novel was released on January 7, 2015 in Japan, with two additional light novels released in 2016. A game based on the series for Android and iOS devices has been released in Japan in February 2015.

Plot
The Earth Defense Club at Binan High School (Yumoto Hakone, En Yufuin, Atsushi Kinugawa, Io Naruko and Ryuu Zaou) who regularly attend a local bathhouse run by Yumoto's brother, are approached by a strange pink wombat-like being from another planet who charges them (rather involuntarily) with the task of saving the world. Using a set of "Loveracelets" he gives them, the group transforms into , who use the power of love to combat foes intent on spreading hate and discord. As they battle, they encounter the Earth Conquest Club under the influence of a small green hedgehog-like creature named Zundar; student council members Kinshiro Kusatsu, Ibushi Arima and Akoya Gero become their enemies who are also responsible for creating the monsters the Lovers fight.

Characters

Earth Defense Club
Originally an unofficial school club, the Earth Defense Club became semi-official because its members occupied a club room that had "Earth Defense Club (lol)" on a sign hanging on its door. The student council repeatedly pester them to formally register their club. The club finally receives reluctant approval in season 1, episode 5.

He is a first year student whose family owns a bathhouse named Kurotamayu. He is a carefree boy who adores animals, cute things, and also loves food. He transforms into the Sparkling Prince; Battle Lover . His color is red and his element is light. His love stick is called Lumiere of Love that has a red glass heart ornament. The attacks Yumoto can perform with this love stick are Scarlet Lumiere; Scarlet's finisher in which he shoots a sparkling red beam and Love Sprinkle by pouring a drop of love from the tip of his love stick.

He is a third year student. He is a major sloth and does everything at his own pace. He is usually seen with Atsushi. En is also portrayed as somewhat vain, having reached 18 he becomes concerned that his youthful looks are fading. He transforms into the Flashing Prince; Battle Lover . His color is blue and his element is water. His love stick is called Purifying Aqua that has a blue crown ornament. The attacks En can perform with this love stick are Cerulean Aqua; Cerulean’s finisher in which he shoots a blue water current/ stream.

He is a third year student and the only one who wears glasses in the club. He comes from a rich family, has good grades and is very serious. Sometimes, he has to keep an eye on En. He is also childhood friends with Kinshiro. He transforms into the Piercing Prince; Battle Lover . His color is green and his element is air. His love stick is called Gallant Hurricane that has a Green Clover Ornament. The attacks Atsushi can perform with this love stick are Epinard Hurricane; Epinard’s finisher in which he shoots a green tornado.

He is a second year student. Despite being in high school, he makes money on the stock market. His motto is "Life is all about Money!". He is very close to Ryuu and possibly has romantic feelings for him. He transforms into the Roaring Prince; Battle Lover . His color is yellow and his element is earth. His love stick is called Raging Gaia that has a large Yellow Saturn Planet Ornament. The attacks Io can perform with this love stick are Sulfur Gaia; Sulfur’s finisher in which he shoots a yellow light with countless gravels/ rocks.

He is a second year student. He is popular with girls (although this is rumored to be false), with date requests being poured in his phone. He is best friends with Io. He transforms into the Thrilling Prince; Battle Lover . His color is pink and his element is fire. His love stick is called Blazing Ignit that has a large Pink Flame Ornament. The attacks Ryuu Io can perform with this love stick are Vesta Ignit; Vesta’s finisher in which he shoots a pink beam of flame/fire.

 A strange pink wombat looking creature that appeared from a distant planet, who tells the boys their mission to protect the earth from bad aliens and to fill it with love. The majority of The Earth Defense Club try to shake him off as an abnormal nuisance, minus Yumoto of course. However, Wombat quickly remedies this issue by controlling En and Atsushi's homeroom teacher, Mr. Tawarayama, simply by making him hold him. Wombat quickly tries to lasso The Earth Defense Club in by chasing them around whilst begging them to "help him learn about Earth". However, because of the corpse-like state of mind control he has Mr. Tawarayama under, the boys quickly run in fear under the impression that Wombat has killed the teacher.

Conquest Club

He is a third year student and the student council president. He is childhood friends with Atsushi, but their relationship is distant. He dislikes that Atsushi hangs around En and the rest of the club. He transforms into . At the end of season 1, he re-establishes his friendship with Atsushi.

He is a third year student and the student council vice-president. He usually stands by Kinshiro, acting as if he was his butler. He transforms into .

He is a second year student. He has an angelic appearance and is a vain individual. He is in the same class as Io and Ryuu, but he does not get along with Ryuu very well. He transforms into .

Zundar is a green hedgehog-looking creature that came from a distant planet to conquer Earth. He ends his sentences with "dar".

Monsters
People who have strong negative feelings that get turned into monsters by Caerula Adamas from Zundar's Needle. The names of the loveless foreshadow what kind of monster they become.

An average, ordinary third-year high school student who doesn't stand out. He is turned into a chikuwabu monster.

A high school student who is obsessed with order and rules. He is turned into a chopsticks monster.

The narcissist Binan High School Ballet Club adviser obsessed with winning the school's pretty boy contest. He is turned into a black swan monster.

A "guy with the face of a 50-year old" high school student. He was turned into a bishōnen monster who turned everyone into children.

A high-school student whose life is controlled by his father. He turns into a squid-like remote control monster.

A third-year high-school student whose grades are "always No. 1". When his grade drops to No. 2 behind Io, his jealousy attracted Caerula Adamas and he was turned into a screw tank monster.

A second-year high-school student who transferred to Binan High School at the end of his first year. After getting sick with flu, he stopped coming to school and became a shut-in. He is turned into a hikikomori monster that turned best friends on each other.

An excessively self-conscious high-school student who is turned into a melon monster.

Yumoto's classmate and manager of the baseball club who enjoys the attention he gets from his "meganedanshi" look. When Yumoto's cold turned him into a meganedanshi as well, Rui's jealousy got him turned into a baseball bat dog like monster with glasses.

Others

He is Yumoto's older brother, who helps run the bathhouse. He is almost always seen chopping wood for the baths. In the final episode of season 1, he is revealed to be the original Battle Lover.

He is the President of the Binan High Press Society. He is often seen persistently observing the Defense Club.

He is the photographer for the Binan High Press Society. He is normally expressionless, but becomes very passionate when he is taking pictures.

A mysterious talking goldfish that involved with the Binan High Press Society. In the final episode, it is revealed that the entire time he had been broadcasting a reality show about the Battle Lovers and Caerula Adamas across the universe.

En and Atsushi's instructor; supposedly killed in an incident by tripping over Wombat and falling down a flight of stairs, Wombat quickly explains that he is not technically dead. However, he has to remain in close proximity in order to keep the teacher from suffering the effects of decomposition and uses him as a cover to appear inconspicuous. Tawarayama briefly recovers in "Love, Training Camp and Toothbrushes" but is accidentally injured again, rendering him comatose once more. As none of them witnessed his recovery, they do not know if he is an animate corpse or he will simply wake up soon.

Season 2

Vepper

He is a second year student, and twins with Haruhiko. He transforms into the twins shining in the heavens, Melty Luna (空に輝く二つ星・メルティルーナ, Sora ni kagayaku futatsu boshi Merutirūna). He and his brother despise Yumoto and are enamored by his older brother, Gora.

He is a second year student, and twins with Akihiko. He transforms into The twins shining in the heavens, Salty Sol (空に輝く二つ星・ソルティーソル, Sora ni kagayaku futatsu boshi Sorutīsoru). He and his brother despise Yumoto and are enamored by his older brother, Gora.

The twins' flying squirrel-like mascot who is Zundar's brother and serves the same purpose as him.

Monsters
People who are overcome with jealously and are turned into monsters by The Vepper by launching Dadacha at their victim, after which he latches himself to the victim's face and transforms the said victim into a loveless. The names of the loveless are puns on what kind of monster they become.

Turned into an hourglass monster, he wishes to go to the past as he has the earliest birthday among his classmates.

A high school student who believes beauty is a sin. He is turned into a tofu monster.

He is turned into a microphone monster from his desperation to steal the spotlight.

An Italian exchange student who is turned into a chest hair monster for having a hairless chest unlike his twin brother.

He is turned into a volleyball monster.

He is turned into a panda monster.

He is turned into a reindeer monster due to his loneliness during Christmas.

He is turned into a snowman monster.

One of The Vepper's henchmen who they turn into a merry-go-round monster.

Media

Anime

The series, which was directed by Shinji Takamatsu at Diomedéa and written by Michiko Yokote, aired in Japan between January 6, 2015 and March 24, 2015 and was streamed by Crunchyroll, Funimation, and Viewster. The series is licensed in North America by Ponycan USA, who began releasing the series on Blu-ray Disc and DVD in August 2015. The second season aired in Japan titled Cute High Earth Defense Club Love! Love! from July 7, 2016 to September 27, 2016.

Manga
A parallel manga entitled Binan Kokou Chikyuu Seifuku-bu Love! (lit. 'Cute High Earth Conquest Club Love!') has finished its monthly serialization in Pony Canyon's web comics magazine, having started on October 16, 2014. The manga focuses more on the lives of the series' antagonists.

Light Novel
A light novel series written by Natsuko Takahashi and illustrated by Yumiko Hara was released in Japan on January 7, 2015 as a paperback novel.

OVA
A OVA titled Binan Koukou Chikyuu Boueibu LOVE! LOVE! LOVE! (美男高校地球防衛部LOVE! LOVE! LOVE!), subtitled The Graduation of Love and Youth! (愛と青春の卒業!, Ai to Seishun no Sotsugyou!) which aired in select theatres across Japan for a 3-week period in August and September 2017, starting on August 26. It was preceded by an all night season two screening/advance OVA screening on August 25, 2017, exclusive to the Ticket Pia booking system. The OVA is said to be the "concluding chapter" about the graduation of the 3rd years. The opening theme is Eternal Future LOVE YOU ALL (永遠未来LOVE YOU ALL, Eien Mirai LOVE YOU ALL), while the ending is From Both Our Hearts (心と心で, Kokoro to Kokoro de). both by the Earth Defense Club.

Reception
Reviews for the anime have been generally positive. Amy McNulty from Anime News Network gave the first three episodes of the series an "A" rating writing that: "Cute High Earth Defense Club LOVE! should make any anime fan laugh, although long-time fans of magical girl shows will get the jokes better by default. As a parody of a genre that can still entertain in its own right, this series walks the line of critiquing and venerating the magical girl genre with finesse. It's comedic, but it's not a gag-a-minute affair. Yes, it has over-the-top situations, but it's just slightly less believable than the typical magical girl show, so it works. We're not laughing at the show, we're laughing with it." When reviewing the ninth episode, to which she gave an A+ rating, McNulty later wrote that it: "demonstrates that the show entertains best when it's both a parody and a magical boy show in its own right. The fact that the boys are able to talk the melon monster down before they heal him with love is another fun twist on the give-speeches-about-justice-to-monster-then-heal-with-love formula. Overall, the viewers spend more time with this monster than any of the previous ones, paving the way for laughs aplenty."

Ian Wolf writing for Anime UK News gave the first two episodes a rating of 9 out of 10 saying: "Cute High Earth Defense Club LOVE! has so far proven itself to be a highly entertaining show, mainly because of the knowing parody it contains. The series mocks all of the normal magical girl tropes, whether it is the poses, the lines that are spouted, the transformations, or the attacks. The only real difference is the fact that you have male characters instead of female ones." He also stated comparisons to shows such as Ouran High School Host Club, a romantic comedy manga which also parodies romantic manga; and Free! in which he compares the similar fan-bases, namely fujoshi, saying: "Let's be honest, we all knew that as soon as the concept of five attractive boys akin to magical girls was revealed that every fujoshi and fudanshi was preparing to write quite a lot fan fiction."

In a review of the first three episodes Dan Barnett of UK-Anime Network gave the series 7 out of 10 claiming that: "Cute High Earth Defence Club Love is a series that has the potential to be a bit of a breakout hit if it plays its cards right. The series is undeniably hilarious as the characters take everything around them seriously, and sexual innuendo flies around so much that it's impossible to keep a straight face. The pains that Wombat must go through to try and avoid being cuddled by Yumoto are fantastically funny too! What might hold it back though is that three episodes in there's little evidence of a plot other than the bog standard 'bad guys make monster of the week' fare that's typical of the genre. ... It's a tricky line to walk if the series wants to keep as wide an audience as possible, though there are certainly fans around who'll happily pick-up another pretty-boy series to fill the void left by Free."

References

External links
 
  
 

2015 Japanese television series endings
2015 comics endings
Anime with original screenplays
Diomedéa
Magical girl parodies
Parody anime and manga
TV Tokyo original programming
Fictional wombats
Magical boy